The Swellies (or Swillies - Welsh: Pwll Ceris) is a stretch of the Menai Strait in North Wales. The most popular use of the name is for the stretch between the Britannia Bridge and the Menai Bridge.

It is notable for its difficulty in safely navigating its shoals and rocks due to the whirlpools and surges that are the result of the tides washing around the island of Anglesey at different speeds. There are several small islands in The Swellies, the largest of which are Church Island (Welsh: Ynys Dysilio) and Ynys Gored Goch (Red Weir Island in English but also known as Whitebait Island).

Swellies is the most treacherous section of the Menai Strait. A medieval document quoted in the book 'The Menai Strait' [2003] (also published in Welsh under the title 'Y Fenai' [2002]) by Gwyn Pari Huws and Terry Beggs (Gwasg Gomer Press) states: In that arm of the see that departeth between this island Mon and North Wales is a swelowe that draweth to schippes that seileth and sweloweth hem yn, as doth Scylla and Charybdis - therefore we may nouzt seile by this swalowe but slily at the full see.

See also
Menai Suspension Bridge

External links
Illustrated guide from the local lifeboat station
Details and photographs of HMS Conway being towed through the Swellies

Menai Strait